Dorris is a city in Siskiyou County, California, United States. Its population is 860 as of the 2020 census, down from 939 from the 2010 census. The town being small, the only attractions are the flagpole and county library. The most notable people who have been residents of Dorris are two athletes who were born here.

Geography
Dorris is located at  (41.965075, −121.918967). Dorris is located in the Butte Valley of northern California between Mount Shasta and the Oregon border on U.S. Route 97.

History
The town was named in 1907 by the Southern Pacific Railroad for brothers Presley A. and Carlos J. Dorris who raised stock in Little Shasta in the 1860s before moving to Dorris' Bridge on the Pit River, renamed Alturas, California in 1876.

Demographics

2010
At the 2010 census Dorris had a population of 939. The racial makeup of Dorris was 764 (81.4%) White, 19 (2.0%) African American, 18 (1.9%) Native American, 5 (0.5%) Asian, 8 (0.9%) Pacific Islander, 77 (8.2%) from other races, and 48 (5.1%) from two or more races. Hispanic or Latino of any race were 197 people (21.0%).

The whole population lived in households, no one lived in non-institutionalized group quarters and no one was institutionalized.

There were 364 households, 125 (34.3%) had children under the age of 18 living in them, 171 (47.0%) were opposite-sex married couples living together, 47 (12.9%) had a female householder with no husband present, 23 (6.3%) had a male householder with no wife present. There were 33 (9.1%) unmarried opposite-sex partnerships, and 1 (0.3%) same-sex married couples or partnerships. 106 households (29.1%) were one person and 44 (12.1%) had someone living alone who was 65 or older. The average household size was 2.58. There were 241 families (66.2% of households); the average family size was 3.15.

The age distribution was 240 people (25.6%) under the age of 18, 91 people (9.7%) aged 18 to 24, 216 people (23.0%) aged 25 to 44, 256 people (27.3%) aged 45 to 64, and 136 people (14.5%) who were 65 or older. The median age was 38.2 years. For every 100 females, there were 102.4 males. For every 100 females age 18 and over, there were 94.2 males.

There were 414 housing units at an average density of 576.5 per square mile, of the occupied units 248 (68.1%) were owner-occupied and 116 (31.9%) were rented. The homeowner vacancy rate was 3.9%; the rental vacancy rate was 7.2%. 584 people (62.2% of the population) lived in owner-occupied housing units and 355 people (37.8%) lived in rental housing units.

2000

At the 2000 census there were 886 people in 342 households, including 240 families, in the city. The racial makeup of the city was 82.62% White, 5.53% Native American, 0.11% Asian, 0.11% Pacific Islander, 8.13% from other races, and 3.50% from two or more races. Hispanic or Latino of any race were 16.37%.

Of the 342 households 32.7% had children under the age of 18 living with them, 52.0% were married couples living together, 14.9% had a female householder with no husband present, and 29.8% were non-families. 27.2% of households were one person and 13.2% were one person aged 65 or older. The average household size was 2.59 and the average family size was 3.13.

The age distribution was 30.6% under the age of 18, 7.6% from 18 to 24, 22.5% from 25 to 44, 23.6% from 45 to 64, and 15.8% 65 or older. The median age was 35 years. For every 100 females, there were 93.0 males. For every 100 females age 18 and over, there were 84.7 males.

The median household income was $21,801 and the median family income was $24,265. Males had a median income of $25,139 versus $21,250 for females. The per capita income for the city was $11,447. About 17.9% of families and 19.1% of the population were below the poverty line, including 25.8% of those under age 18 and 3.5% of those age 65 or over.

Local attractions
Notable locations in town include the Dorris Branch of the Siskiyou County Public Library, Dorris City Hall, Dorris Fire Department, two schools, the Siskiyou County Dorris-Tulelake Branch Courts and the Butte Valley Museum. Dorris is home to what was once the country's tallest flagpole west of the Mississippi, and still the tallest west of the Rockies. It was surpassed in 2002 by a larger 300-foot pole in Laredo, Texas and in 2014 by a 400-foot pole in Sheboygan, Wisconsin.

Infrastructure
U.S. Highway 97 is a major north–south United States highway and divides Dorris from southeast to northwest.  California State Route 161 joins Highway 97 just north of Dorris.

The Butte Valley National Grassland is a  United States National Grassland located between Dorris and Macdoel along Highway 97.

Education
The Butte Valley Unified School District administers the elementary, middle and high school in Dorris.

The Butte Valley High School Bulldogs are members of the Evergreen League, a high school sports league whose athletic teams are members of the Northern Section of the California Interscholastic Federation.

Government

Notable people

Bernie Hughes, National Football League player was born in Dorris.
Nelson Briles, Major League Baseball pitcher born in Dorris.

References

External links

City Website
Butte Valley Chamber of Commerce

Incorporated cities and towns in California
Cities in Siskiyou County, California